Tina Osborne (born 4 May 1979) is a New Zealand darts player who competes in World Darts Federation events. Of Māori descent, her iwi (tribal) affiliations are to Ngāti Porou and Ngāti Awa.

World Championship results

BDO
 2016: Last 16 (lost to Zoe Jones 1–2)

References

External links
 Tina Osborne on Darts Database

Living people
New Zealand darts players
British Darts Organisation players
New Zealand Māori sportspeople
New Zealand sportswomen
1979 births
Female darts players
Ngāti Porou people
Ngāti Awa people